Hendrik Jan Davids (born 30 January 1969) is a former professional tennis player from the Netherlands.

During his career, Davids won seven doubles titles and finished as a runner-up 12 times. He achieved a career-high doubles ranking of World No. 26 in 1994.

Career finals

Doubles: 19 (7 wins, 12 losses)

External links
 
 

1969 births
Living people
Dutch male tennis players
People from De Bilt
Sportspeople from Utrecht (province)
20th-century Dutch people